The United States Air Force Academy is an undergraduate college in Colorado Springs, Colorado, with the mission of educating and commissioning officers for the United States Air Force and United States Space Force. The Academy was established in 1954, entered its first class in 1955, and graduated its first class in 1959. All students hold the Air Force rank of "Cadet." Sports media refer to the Academy as "Air Force"; this usage is officially endorsed. Most cadets are admitted through a congressional appointment system. The curriculum is broad-based but has traditionally emphasized science and engineering. Before the Academy's first graduating class in 1959, the United States Military Academy and United States Naval Academy were the primary sources of officers for the Air Force and its predecessors, the Army Air Corps and Army Air Forces. Though the primary focus of the Academy is for the Air Force and Space Force, some graduates are given the option of "cross-commissioning" into the United States Army, United States Navy, United States Marine Corps, or United States Coast Guard.

This list is drawn from graduates, non-graduate former cadets, current cadets, and faculty of the Air Force Academy. Over 410 noted scholars from a variety of academic fields are Academy graduates, including: 41 Rhodes Scholars, 9 Marshall Scholars, 13 Harry S. Truman Scholars, 115 John F. Kennedy School of Government Scholars, and 31 Gerahart Scholars. Additional notable graduates include 794 general officers, 164 graduates who were killed in combat, 36 repatriated prisoners of war, 1 Medal of Honor recipient, and 2 combat aces. Thirty-nine Academy graduates have become astronauts, second among institutions of higher learning only to the United States Naval Academy with 52.

Academics
"Class year" refers to the individual's class year, which usually is the same as the individual's graduation year. In times of war, academy classes may graduate early, but this has never happened yet at the Air Force Academy.

Superintendents of the Academy

Astronauts

Athletes

Businesspeople

Civilian aviation

Government

Legislators

Literary figures

Air Force figures

Air Force Chiefs of Staff

Air Force Vice Chiefs of Staff

Commanders of Air Force Major Commands

Notable Vietnam War combatants

Notable Gulf War combatants

Notable War on Terror combatants

Other notable Air Force graduates

Space Force figures

Space Force Vice Chiefs of Space Operations

Commanders of Space Force Field Commands

Space Force general officers

Television figures

Non-graduates
As these alumni did not graduate, their class year is listed as "x-" followed by the class year they would have graduated, if known, and they are listed alphabetically by last name.

References

External links
Blue Alliance - LGBT Alumni of the US Air Force Academy

United States Air Force Academy alumni
United States Air Force Academy alumni
 
Academy alumni